Ubuntu Studio is a recognized flavor of the Ubuntu Linux distribution, which is geared to general multimedia production. The original version, based on Ubuntu 7.04, was released on 10 May 2007.

Features

Real-time kernel
The real-time kernel, first included with Ubuntu Studio 8.04, was modified for intensive audio, video or graphics work. The 8.10 Ubuntu Studio release lacks this real-time kernel. It has been reimplemented in the 9.04 Ubuntu Studio release and stabilized with the release of 9.10. 10.04 Ubuntu Studio, in contrast, does not include the real-time kernel by default. As of version 10.10 of the Ubuntu Studio, the real-time kernel is no longer available in the repositories.

Low-latency kernel 
As of Ubuntu Studio 12.04, the default kernel is linux-lowlatency, which in essence is a generic Ubuntu Linux kernel, with a tweaked configuration to allow for stable operation for audio applications at lower latencies. Since much of the real-time patch has now been implemented into the vanilla kernel, and considering the difficulties in maintaining linux-rt, Ubuntu Studio decided on using linux-lowlatency in its place.

The scheduler allows applications to request immediate CPU time, which can drastically reduce audio latency.
In 9.10, the "Ubuntu Studio Controls" provided under System>Administration permit the user to "Enable Nice", allowing the use of wireless networking and proprietary graphics cards drivers while maintaining low audio latency free of XRUNs (audio drop-outs) in JACK.  A more negative value entered for nice reserves more CPU time for real-time audio processes.

Appearance and sound theme
Ubuntu Studio also includes custom artwork and a blue-on-black theme, as opposed to Ubuntu's default purple and orange.  As with the main distribution of Ubuntu, if an accelerated graphics card and appropriate driver are used, the advanced desktop effects can be enabled.  More advanced Compiz effects are available in the Synaptic Package Manager (i.e., Ubuntu repositories).  In Karmic 9.10, a fresh sound theme replaces the default Ubuntu theme, with a reverberating melody at startup, and an occasional knock or ping from a button or prompt.  Xfce (instead of GNOME) was the default user interface until v20.04. From Ubuntu Studio 20.10, the default user interface became KDE.

Access to Ubuntu repositories
An important advantage of Ubuntu Studio over most other Linux distributions employing the real-time kernel is access to the same repositories available to the main Ubuntu distributions through the Update Manager, Synaptic Package Manager, as well as through the Add/Remove Applications prompt.  This allows for much more frequent operating system updates, and access to a much wider range of software.

Installation 
In the past there has been no live version available of Ubuntu Studio, and no graphical installer. Since the 12.04 release, Ubuntu Studio has been available as a Live DVD.  The disk image is about 1.8 GB, too large to fit on a standard CD, and as a result the recommended installation medium for Ubuntu Studio is a DVD or USB flash drive. Ubuntu Studio can also be installed on a pre-existing Ubuntu installation by installing the "ubuntustudio-desktop" package from Advanced Packaging Tool.

In 9.10, the package "ubuntustudio-audio," shown during installation (and also available in the Synaptic Package Manager), cannot be installed without a working Internet connection.

An Internet connection is required after installation to maintain system components.

Software included

Audio
 a2jmidid – a2jmidid is a daemon for exposing legacy ALSA sequencer applications in JACK MIDI system.
 Ardour – version 4 of the hard disk recorder and digital audio workstation application (Works with JACK).
 Audacious – a lightweight audio player.
 Audacity – a digital audio editor application.
 BEAST – music composition and modular synthesis application.
 Creox – A real-time guitar effects program (works with JACK).
 FluidSynth with GUI QSynth – Software Wavetable Synthesizer (Works with JACK).
 Hydrogen – an advanced drum machine (Works with JACK).
 JACK Audio Connection Kit – a sound server daemon that provides low latency connections between applications for both audio and MIDI data.
 Jack Rack – Virtual rackmount of LADSPA DSP effects plugins (Works with JACK).
 JAMin – the JACK Audio Connection Kit Audio Mastering interface (Works with JACK).
 LilyPond – a program for engraving sheet music
 MusE – a MIDI/Audio sequencer using JACK and ALSA
 MuseScore – a music scorewriter for Linux, Microsoft Windows, and Mac
 Patchage – GUI access to patch MIDI and Audio software together for JACK.
 Pure Data – a programming environment for multimedia (Works with Jack).
 Tapiir – a software multitap delay with realtime audio I/O. (works with JACK).
 Timemachine – Records the last 30 seconds of sound to the hard drive, so a 'one off' sound can be captured (Works with JACK).
 TiMidity++ – a software synthesizer that is able to convert from MIDI to various formats.
 Xwax – a vinyl record emulator.
 Yoshimi – based on ZynAddSubFX but improves audio and MIDI capabilities. JACK performance is also improved.

Installable from the Software-Center
 Mixxx – a digital DJ - style mixing program.
 Rosegarden – a digital audio workstation program (works with JACK). Not included since release 12.
 ZynAddSubFX – a complex yet easy to use subtractive, additive, FM synthesizer with DSP effects, and exceptional software synthesizer. Works with JACK.

Video
 Pitivi – a video editing program 
 Kino – a non-linear digital video editor
 OpenShot - a simple, linear video editing program
 Kdenlive - non-linear video editor by KDE (not referenced on website)
 Stopmotion – a stop-motion animation movie creator
 VLC media player – a media player, was removed before 7.04 Feisty
 Xjadeo – a simple video player that gets sync from JACK transport

Graphics
 Agave – a color scheme generator
 Blender – a 3D animation program
 Enblend – an image compositing program
 FontForge – a typeface (font) editor program
 GIMP – a raster graphics editor
 Hugin – photo stitching and HDR merging program
 Inkscape – a vector graphics editor
 Krita – a free and open-source painting application 
 Scribus – a desktop publishing application
 Synfig – a 2D vector graphics and timeline-based animation program

See also
 Planet CCRMA – a set of Red Hat packages of multimedia production software
 Dyne:bolic – a multimedia creation oriented Live CD
 Puredyne – a multimedia oriented Live CD
 Long-term support (LTS) release.

References

External links 

 Ubuntu Studio homepage
 Ubuntu Studio applications
 Ubuntu Wiki
 Boing Boing - Ubuntu studio - Linux for multimedia creation (21 July 2007)
 

Linux media creation distributions
Ubuntu derivatives
Linux distributions

de:Ubuntu#Ubuntu Studio